The Bugs Bunny Cartoon Workshop is a 1991 video game published by Hi Tech Expressions.

Gameplay
The Bugs Bunny Cartoon Workshop is a computer animation software package for teaching how to create animated videos.

Reception
Roy Wagner reviewed the program for Computer Gaming World, and stated that "For quick and easy animations, The Bugs Bunny Cartoon Workshop is highly recommended (especially for children and beginners). It is possible to actually create some very funny cartoons and just playing with the program's options is very satisfying."

Reviews
Compute!
Intermedia Games—Games Inter Media: Video Games and Intermediality
Computer Gaming World

References

2D animation software